Professor Martindale Sidwell FRCO (23 February 1916 – 20 February 1998)  was an English organist, composer and teacher.

Education

John William Martindale Sidwell  was born in Little Packington, Warwickshire on 23 February 1916, the son of John William Sidwell, a musician, and Mary Martindale. At age 7 he joined the choir at Wells Cathedral, and later became assistant organist. He was awarded ARCO in 1936 and FRCO in 1938.

During the Second World War he served firstly with the North Somerset Yeomanry and later with the Royal Engineers. Invalided out he became temporary organist at Holy Trinity Church, Leamington Spa and director of music at Warwick School.

He studied at the Royal Academy of Music with C.H. Trevor.

In 1944 he married Barbara Hill, a pianist and harpsichordist.

Appointments

Sub Organist at Wells Cathedral 1932 - ?
Assistant Organist at Wells Cathedral 1938 - ?
Temporary Organist at Holy Trinity Church, Leamington Spa
Conductor of the Leamington Spa Choral Society
Organist of St John-at-Hampstead 1946 - 1992
Organist of St Clement Danes 1957 - 1992
Conductor of the London Bach Orchestra 1967 - 1981
Conductor of Hampstead Choral Society 1946 - 1981
Conductor of the Martindale Sidwell Singers 1956 - 1992
Organ tutor at Trinity College of Music and Professor of Organ at the Royal Academy of Music 1963 -1984
Professor at the Royal School of Church Music 1958 - 1966

Compositions

He composed one piece which remained unpublished in his lifetime, a Festal Jubilate for choir and organ.  A number of Anglican chants by him are still in the repertoire of some Cathedrals and major churches.

Publications

He was one of the editors of Secular and Sacred Music published in 1966.

References

1916 births
1998 deaths
English organists
British male organists
Fellows of the Royal College of Organists
20th-century English musicians
20th-century organists
20th-century British male musicians